Neyt Point is a point forming the east extremity of Kran Peninsula which lies 1 nautical mile (1.9 km) southeast of Moureaux Point, the north extremity of Liege Island in the Palmer Archipelago, Antarctica. It was discovered by the Belgian Antarctic Expedition, 1897–99, under Gerlache, and named by him for General Neyt,  of the Belgian Army, a supporter of the expedition. The point was photographed from the air by FIDASE, 1956-57.

External links 
 Neyt Point on USGS website
 Neyt Point on AADC website
 Neyt Point on SCAR website
 Neyt Point Copernix satellite image

See also
Mount Allo

References 

Headlands of the Palmer Archipelago
Liège Island